Geoffrey Green (1911–1990) was a British football writer.

Geoffrey Green may also refer to:

Geoffrey Green (politician) (1901–1959), Australian politician

See also
Jeffrey Green (born 1944), British historian and writer
Jeff Green (disambiguation)